Baseball was introduced to Japan in 1872 and is Japan's most popular participatory and spectator sport. The first professional competitions emerged in the 1920s. The highest level of baseball in Japan is Nippon Professional Baseball (NPB), which consists of two leagues, the Central League and the Pacific League, with six teams in each league. High school baseball enjoys a particularly strong public profile and fan base, much like college football and college basketball in the United States; the Japanese High School Baseball Championship ("Summer Kōshien"), which takes place each August, is nationally televised and includes regional champions from each of Japan's 47 prefectures.

In Japanese, baseball is commonly called  (yakyū), combining the characters for field and ball. According to the Japan National Tourism Organization (JNTO), the atmosphere of Japanese baseball games is less relaxed than in the United States, with fans regularly singing and dancing to team songs. In addition, as American writer Robert Whiting wrote in his 1977 book The Chrysanthemum and the Bat, "the Japanese view of life, stressing group identity, cooperation, hard work, respect for age, seniority and 'face' has permeated almost every aspect of the sport. Americans who come to play in Japan quickly realize that Baseball Samurai Style is different."

In Japan, Nippon Professional Baseball players such as Shohei Ohtani, Ichiro Suzuki, Hideki Matsui, Shigeo Nagashima and Sadaharu Oh are regarded as national stars, and their exceptional performances have boosted baseball's popularity in Japan. All of them received or were approached for the People's Honour Award (国民栄誉賞, Kokumin Eiyoshō) for their achievements and popularity.

History

Baseball was first introduced to Japan as a school sport in 1872 by American Horace Wilson, an English professor at the Kaisei Academy in Tokyo. The first organized adult baseball team, called the Shimbashi Athletic Club, was established in 1878.

The Japanese government appointed American oyatoi in order to start a state-inspired modernization process. This involved the education ministry, who made baseball accessible to children by integrating the sport into the physical education curriculum. Japanese students, who returned from studying in the United States captivated by the sport, took government positions. Clubs and private teams such as the Shinbashi Athletic Club, along with high school and college teams, commenced the baseball infrastructure.

At a match played in Yokohama in 1896, a team from Tokyo's Ichikō high school convincingly defeated a team of resident foreigners from the Yokohama Country & Athletic Club. The contemporary Japanese language press lauded the team as national heroes and news of this match greatly contributed to the popularity of baseball as a school sport. Tsuneo Matsudaira in his "Sports and Physical Training in Modern Japan" address to The Japan Society of the UK in London in 1907 related that after the victory, "the game spread, like a fire in a dry field, in summer, all over the country, and some months afterwards, even in children in primary schools in the country far away from Tōkyō were to be seen playing with bats and balls."

Professional baseball

Professional baseball in Japan first started in the 1920s, but it was not until the Greater Japan Tokyo Baseball Club (大日本東京野球クラブ Dai-nippon Tōkyō Yakyū Kurabu) a team of all-stars established in 1934 by media mogul Matsutarō Shōriki, that the modern professional game found continued success—especially after Shōriki's club matched up against an American All-Star team that included Babe Ruth, Jimmie Foxx, Lou Gehrig, and Charlie Gehringer. While prior Japanese all-star contingents had disbanded, Shōriki went pro with this group, playing in an independent league.

The first Japanese professional league was formed in 1936, and by 1950 had grown big enough to divide into two leagues, the Central League and the Pacific League, together known as Nippon Professional Baseball (NPB). It is called , meaning professional baseball.  The pro baseball season is eight months long, with games beginning in April. Teams play 144 games (as compared to the 162 games of the American major league teams), followed by a playoff system, culminating in a championship held in October, known as the Japan Series.

Corporations with interests outside baseball own most of the teams. Historically, teams have been identified with their owners, not where the team is based. However, in recent years, many owners have chosen to include a place name in the names of their teams; the majority of the 12 Nippon Professional Baseball (NPB) teams are currently named with both corporate and geographical place names.

Minor leagues 
Much like Minor League Baseball in the United States, Japan has a farm system through two minor leagues, each affiliated with Nippon Professional Baseball. The Eastern League consists of seven teams and is owned by the Central League. The Western League consists of five teams and is owned by the Pacific League. Both minor leagues play 80-game seasons.

Differences from Major League Baseball 
The rules are essentially those of Major League Baseball (MLB), but technical elements are slightly different: The Nippon league uses a smaller baseball, strike zone, and playing field. Five Nippon league teams have fields whose small dimensions would violate the American Official Baseball Rules.

Also unlike MLB, game length is limited and tie games are allowed. In the regular season, the limit is twelve innings, while in the playoffs, there is a fifteen-inning limit (games in Major League Baseball, by comparison, continue until there is a winner). Additionally, due to power limits imposed because of the 2011 Tōhoku earthquake and tsunami, the 2011 NPB regular season further limited game length by adding a restriction that no inning could begin more than three hours and thirty minutes after the first pitch.

NPB teams have active rosters of 28 players, as opposed to 26 in MLB (27 on days of scheduled day-night doubleheaders). However, the game roster has a 25-player limit. Before each game, NPB teams must designate three players from the active roster who will not appear in that contest.  A team cannot have more than four foreign players on a 25-man game roster, although there is no limit on the number of foreign players that it may sign. If there are four, they cannot all be pitchers nor all be position players.  This limits the cost and competition for expensive players of other nationalities, and is similar to rules in many European sports leagues' roster limits on non-European players.

In each of the two Nippon Professional Baseball leagues, teams with the best winning percentage go on to a stepladder-format playoff (3 vs. 2, winner vs. 1). Occasionally, a team with more total wins has been seeded below a team that had more ties and fewer losses and, therefore, had a better winning percentage.  The winners of each league compete in the Japan Series.

Strike of 2004 
On 18 September 2004, professional baseball players went on a two-day strike, the first strike in the history of the league, to protest the proposed merger between the Orix BlueWave and the Osaka Kintetsu Buffaloes and the failure of the owners to agree to create a new team to fill the void resulting from the merger. The strike was settled on 23 September 2004, when the owners agreed to grant a new franchise in the Pacific League and to continue the two-league, 12-team system. The new team, the Tohoku Rakuten Golden Eagles, began play in the 2005 season.

High school baseball

In Japan,  generally refers to the two annual baseball tournaments played by high schools nationwide culminating in a final showdown at Hanshin Kōshien Stadium in Nishinomiya.  They are organized by the Japan High School Baseball Federation in association with Mainichi Shimbun for the National High School Baseball Invitational Tournament in the spring (also known as "Spring Kōshien") and Asahi Shimbun for the National High School Baseball Championship in the summer (also known as "Summer Kōshien").

These nationwide tournaments enjoy widespread popularity, arguably equal to or greater than professional baseball.  Qualifying tournaments are often televised locally and each game of the final stage at Kōshien is televised nationally on NHK.  The tournaments have become a national tradition, and large numbers of students and parents travel from hometowns to cheer for their local team. The popularity of these tournaments has been compared to the popularity of March Madness in the United States.

Amateur baseball
Amateur baseball leagues exist all over Japan, with many teams sponsored by companies. Amateur baseball is governed by the Japan Amateur Baseball Association (JABA). Players on these teams are employed by their sponsoring companies and receive salaries as company employees, not as baseball players. The best teams in these circuits are determined via the intercity baseball tournament and the Industrial League national tournament.

The level of play in these leagues is very competitive; Industrial League players are often selected to represent Japan in international tournaments and Major League Baseball players such as Hideo Nomo (Shin-Nitetsu Sakai), Junichi Tazawa (Nippon Oil) and Kosuke Fukudome (Nihon Seimei), have been discovered by professional clubs while playing industrial baseball.

International play

Japan has won the World Baseball Classic twice since the tournament was created.  In the 2006 World Baseball Classic, they defeated Cuba in the finals and in 2009 World Baseball Classic Japan defeated South Korea in 10 innings to defend their title.

The national team is consistently ranked one of the best in the world by the World Baseball Softball Confederation.

See also
 Asahi (baseball team)
 Baseball awards#Japan
 Japan national baseball team
 List of Japanese baseball players
 Mr. Baseball, 1992 film
 Sport in Japan

References

Further reading 
 Beach, Jerry. "Godzilla Takes the Bronx". (New York, 2004)
 Bikel, Ofra; Harris, Gail; Woodruff, Judy, et al., "American Game, Japanese Rules" (Alexandria, Va.: PBS Video, 1990).
 Crepeau, Richard C. "Pearl Harbor: A Failure of Baseball?" The Journal of Popular Culture xv.4 (1982): 67–74.
 Cromartie, Warren and Whiting, Robert. Slugging It Out in Japan: An American Major Leaguer in the Tokyo Outfield (New York: Signet, 1992).
 Dabscheck, Braham (October 2006). "Japanese Baseball Takes a Strike" . International Journal of Employment Studies 14.2: pp. 19–34. .
 Hayford, Charles W. "Japanese Baseball or Baseball in Japan?" Japan Focus (April 4, 2007). Reprinted: "Samurai Baseball: Off Base or Safe At Home?", Frog in a Well (April 10, 2007).
 Kelly, William. "Blood and Guts in Japanese Professional Baseball," in Sepp Linhard and Sabine Frustuck, ed., The Culture of Japan as Seen through Its Leisure (Albany: State University of New York Press, 1998): 95–111.
 Kelly, William. "Caught in the Spin Cycle: An Anthropological Observer at the Sites of Japanese Professional Baseball," in Susan O. Long, ed., Moving Targets: Ethnographies of Self and Community in Japan. (Ithaca, 2000)
 Kelly, William. "The Spirit and Spectacle of School Baseball: Mass Media, Statemaking, and 'Edu-Tainment' in Japan, 1905–1935", in William Kelly Umesao Tadao, and Kubo Masatoshi, ed., Japanese Civilization in the Modern World Xiv: Information and Communication (Osaka: National Museum of Ethnology, 2000): 105–116.
 Kelly, William. Fanning the Flames: Fans and Consumer Culture in Contemporary Japan (Albany, NY: State University of New York Press, 2004).
 Kelly, William. "Is Baseball a Global Sport? America's 'National Pastime' as a Global Sport", Global Networks 7.2 (2007):
 Roden, Donald. "Baseball and the Quest for National Dignity in Meiji Japan," The American Historical Review 85.3 (1980): 534.
 Terry, Darin. "International Professional Baseball Procurement" 2010
 Whiting, Robert. The Chrysanthemum and the Bat: Baseball Samurai Style (New York: Dodd, Mead, 1977).
 Whiting, Robert. You Gotta Have Wa: When Two Cultures Collide on the Baseball Diamond (New York: Vintage Books, Vintage departures, 1990).
 Whiting, Robert. "The Japanese Way of Baseball and the National Character Debate", Japan Focus (29 September 2006).

External links 
 JapaneseBaseball.com

 
Japanese culture